John Theodore Buckbee (August 1, 1871 – April 23, 1936) was a U.S. Representative from Illinois.

Born on a farm near Rockford, Illinois, Buckbee attended the public schools of Rockford.
He studied agriculture and horticulture in Austria, France, Holland, Denmark, Sweden, Belgium, Italy, and Great Britain.
He served as president of H.W. Buckbee Seeds, which was established in 1871 by his brother, Hiram W. Buckbee, in Rockford, Illinois.

Buckbee was elected as a Republican to the Seventieth and to the four succeeding Congresses.
He served from March 4, 1927, until his death in Rockford, Illinois, April 23, 1936.
He was not a candidate for renomination in 1936.
He was interred in Greenwood Cemetery in Rockford, Illinois.

See also
 List of United States Congress members who died in office (1900–49)

References

1871 births
1936 deaths
Republican Party members of the United States House of Representatives from Illinois
Politicians from Rockford, Illinois